King Arthur's Knights is an Arthurian board game published by Chaosium in 1978 in which knights of the Round Table perform chivalrous quests for artifacts and treasure.

Description
King Arthur's Knights is a game for 2-5 players in which each player is a knight of King Arthur's court, travelling around Arthurian Britain in quest of holy objects, money, fair damsels in distress and tyrannical monsters to slay.

Gameplay
Players first choose to be a knight errant, a knight at arms, or a great knight; the latter two classes face greater challenges and must accumulate higher victory points but earn greater rewards for success. Once everyone has chosen their knight, a magical treasure and a magical guardian are placed facedown on the map, and all knights set out from Camelot. Knights can choose to wander around the map, hoping to find adventure, or they can elect to draw a card from the Adventure deck and fulfill the resultant quest.

Players can engage each other in personal combat, but this is not a required element of the game.

The game comes with a paper map, a 16-page rulebook, eleven decks of encounter cards, and five cardstock knights — which must be affixed to some sort of base in order to be used — packaged in a zip-lock bag.

Publication history
King Arthur's Knights was designed by Greg Stafford, and was published by Chaosium in 1978 with cover art by Luise Perenne.

Reception
Jacek Gabrielczyk reviewed King Arthur's Knights for White Dwarf #15, giving it an overall rating of 7 out of 10, and stated that "On the whole the game is simple to understand. The rules are printed clearly in easy-to-read steps in a 16 page booklet with the three combat tables printed on the back cover. The physical quality of the game is quite good, the map especially . The only drawbacks are that no dice or reasonable counters are provided and the combat system depends too much on luck for a good result."

In the November 1978 edition of Dragon (Issue 21), S. List admired the map and counters, but thought the knights printed on cardstock were poor, pointing out that the rulebook even suggests that players should substitute miniature figurines for them. List found the game "not very complicated and moves quickly" but overall believed it was designed more as a family game than one for hardcore gamers.

In the inaugural edition of Ares, Greg Costikyan gave King Arthur's Knights an average rating of 6 out of 9, questioning its replayability. ""King Arthur's Knights is an enjoyable game for an evening's entertainment; it is not particularly sophisticated and palls after a few playings, but after all, so do most other games.".

In the 1980 book The Complete Book of Wargames, game designer Jon Freeman commented "Essentially this is a race-and-chase game" and called it "an introduction to role-playing games in a board game format. It's a lighthearted game, devoid of violence and horrible beasties, and quite suitable for children." Freeman did have an issue with the rulebook and components, saying, "Unfortunately the charts and tables are scattered hither and yon about the (rather long) rules, and except for the attractive four-color map, the components are rather primitive." Despite this, Freeman concluded by giving this game an Overall Evaluation of "Good."

References

External links 
 

Board games introduced in 1978
Chaosium games
Greg Stafford games